Jesse Aaron Starkey (born 1 September 1995) is an English professional footballer who plays as a midfielder for Worthing.

Club career
After a spell with Portsmouth, Starkey joined Chelsea in 2006 and began his scholarship in 2012. Although Starkey was a regular for the under-18 side, Chelsea decided against offering the player a professional contract as Jesse Starkey opted not to remain at the club on 13 June. A couple of months later, Starkey joined his hometown club Championship side Brighton & Hove Albion, on a two-year deal.

After a four-year spell at Brighton, Starkey joined League One side Swindon Town on a one-and-a-half year deal. On the final day of the 2016–17 campaign, Starkey made his Swindon debut in their 3–0 away defeat against Charlton Athletic. He was taken off after 69 minutes having been booked just after half-time. On 5 September 2017, it was announced that Starkey had left Swindon, following the termination of his contract.

He returned to League One in joining Gillingham on 15 September 2017. Just over a week later, he made his debut during Gillingham's 0–0 draw with Scunthorpe United, replacing Sean Clare at half-time. In November 2017, Starkey moved on loan to Worthing, of the Isthmian League Premier Division. He went onto feature eight times before returning to Gillingham in January 2018. Following his return, it was announced that Starkey would leave Gillingham following the expiration of his short-term contract.

On 27 January 2018, following his release from Gillingham, Starkey returned to Worthing.

Career statistics

References

External links

1995 births
Living people
Footballers from Brighton
English footballers
Association football midfielders
Portsmouth F.C. players
Chelsea F.C. players
Brighton & Hove Albion F.C. players
Swindon Town F.C. players
Gillingham F.C. players
Worthing F.C. players
English Football League players
England youth international footballers